Summit is an unincorporated community in Stockton Township, Greene County, Indiana. It was named for the former Summit Mine located there in the late 19th and early 20th centuries.

Geography

References

Unincorporated communities in Greene County, Indiana
Unincorporated communities in Indiana
Bloomington metropolitan area, Indiana